Tuqtu (Quechua for "broody hen", also spelled Tucto, Tuctu) may refer to:

 Tuqtu (Ancash), a mountain in the Ancash Region, Peru
 Tuqtu (Canas-Chumbivilcas), a mountain on the border of the provinces of Canas and Chumbivilcas, Cusco Region, Peru
 Tuqtu (Canchis-Quispicanchi), a mountain on the border of the provinces of Canchis and Quispicanchi, Cusco Region, Peru
 Tuqtu (Junín), a mountain in the Junín Region, Peru